Maksim Ivanavich Taleyka (born 20 February 1993) is a Belarusian professional footballer. As of 2021, he plays for Cambodian club Angkor Tiger.

References

External links 
 
 
 Profile at kick-off.by

1993 births
Living people
Belarusian footballers
Association football midfielders
Belarusian expatriate footballers
Expatriate footballers in Kyrgyzstan
Expatriate footballers in Cambodia
FC Gorodeya players
FC Shakhtyor Soligorsk players
FC Isloch Minsk Raion players
FC Smolevichi players
FC Smorgon players
FC Krumkachy Minsk players
FC Slutsk players
Angkor Tiger FC players
Belarus youth international footballers